Sarcopoterium is a genus of flowering plants in the rose family. The genus is sometimes considered synonymous to Poterium. The sole species within this genus, Sarcopoterium spinosum, is common to the southeast Mediterranean region and the Middle East. In English it is known as the prickly, spiny, or thorny burnet It is a perennial bush with small flowers in inflorescence. Sarcopoterium spinosum flowers in February to April and its fruits mature in autumn, then fall to earth to germinate with the rain water.

Sarcopoterium spinosum has spines. In the summer (high temperatures) it is dry and appears dead.

References

Sanguisorbinae
Monotypic Rosaceae genera
Flora of the Mediterranean Basin